Ellis Grove is a village in Randolph County, Illinois, United States. The population was 328 at the 2020 census.

Geography
Ellis Grove is located at  (38.010394, -89.908123).

Demographics

As of the 2000 United States Census, there were 381 people, 145 households, and 102 families residing in the village. The racial makeup of the village was 99.21% White, 0.26% Native American, and 0.52% from two or more races.

There were 145 households, out of which 40.0% had children under the age of 18 living with them, 62.1% were married couples living together, 6.2% had a female householder with no husband present, and 29.0% were non-families. 26.2% of all households were made up of individuals, and 15.9% had someone living alone who was 65 years of age or older. The average household size was 2.63 and the average family size was 3.22.

In the village, the population was spread out, with 29.4% under the age of 18, 7.1% from 18 to 24, 28.1% from 25 to 44, 20.5% from 45 to 64, and 15.0% who were 65 years of age or older. The median age was 36 years. For every 100 females, there were 95.4 males. For every 100 females age 18 and over, there were 97.8 males.

The median income for a household in the village was $33,250, and the median income for a family was $42,750. Males had a median income of $36,667 versus $21,250 for females. The per capita income for the village was $14,527. About 5.9% of families and 8.3% of the population were below the poverty line, including 9.1% of those under age 18 and 2.9% of those age 65 or over.

References

External links
News from Randolph County
The Randolph County Herald Tribune - Local newspaper

Villages in Illinois
Villages in Randolph County, Illinois